Into the Night may refer to:

Film, television and radio 
 Into the Night (1985 film), an American film starring Michelle Pfeiffer and Jeff Goldblum
 B.B. King "Into the Night", a 1985 documentary film including the video for B. B. King's song "Into the Night", written for the above feature film
 Into the Night (1928 film), a 1928 American film starring Agnes Ayres
 When Night Falls or Into the Night, a 1985 Israeli film featuring Assi Dayan
 Into the Night, a 1980s/1990s UK radio programme presented by Nicky Campbell
 Into the Night with Rick Dees, 1990s late-night TV show hosted by Rick Dees
 Into the Night (TV series), a 2020 Belgian television series

Music 
 Into the Night (Son of Sam album), 2008
 Into the Night, a 2008 album by Enforcer
 Into the Night, a 2008 album by Fixmer/McCarthy
 Into the Night (The Raveonettes EP), a 2012 EP
 "Into the Night" (Benny Mardones song), 1980
 "Into the Night" (Santana song), 2007
 "Into the Night" (Yoasobi song), 2021, the English version of "Yoru ni Kakeru"
 "Into the Night", a song by Ace Frehley from Frehley's Comet
 "Into the Night", song by HIM from the album Tears on Tape
 "Into the Night", a song by Julee Cruise from Floating into the Night
 "Into the Night", a song by Super Furry Animals from Hey Venus!
 "Into the Night", a song by Sweet from Sweet Fanny Adams
 "Into the Night", a song by Timothy B. Schmit from Timothy B